Anthyllis is a genus of flowering plants in the family Fabaceae. This genus contains both herbaceous and shrubby species and is distributed in Europe, the Middle East and North Africa. The most widespread and familiar species is A. vulneraria (kidney vetch), a familiar grassland flower which has also been introduced to New Zealand.

Anthyllis species are used as food plants by the larvae of some Lepidoptera species including the following case-bearers of the genus Coleophora: C. acanthyllidis, C. protecta (both feed exclusively on A. tragacanthoides), C. hermanniella (feeds exclusively on A. hermanniae), C. vestalella (feeds exclusively on A. cytisoides) and C. vulnerariae (feeds exclusively on A. vulneraria).

Species
Anthyllis comprises the following species:

Section Anthyllis

 Anthyllis lemanniana Lowe

 Anthyllis vulneraria L.
 subsp. abyssinica (Sagorski) Cullen
 subsp. ajmasiana (Pau) Raynaud & Sauvage
 subsp. alpestris (Hegetschw.) Asch. & Graebn.
 subsp. alpicola (Brugg.) Gutermann
 subsp. argyrophylla (Rothm.) Cullen
 subsp. arundana (Boiss. & Reut.) Vasc.
 subsp. atlantis Emb. & Maire
 subsp. balearica (Coss. ex Mares & Vigin.) O. Bolos & Vigo
 subsp. boissieri (Sagorski) Bornm.
 subsp. borealis (Rouy) Jalas
 subsp. bulgarica (Sagorski) Cullen
 subsp. calcicola (Schur) Simk.
 subsp. carpatica (Pant.) Nyman
 subsp. colorata (Juz.) Tzvelev
 subsp. corbierei (Salmon & Travis) Cullen
 subsp. fatmae Font Quer
 subsp. forondae (Sennen) Cullen
 subsp. fruticans Emb.
 subsp. gandogeri (Sagorski) Maire
 subsp. hispidissima (Sagorski) Cullen
 subsp. iberica (W.Becker) Jalas
 subsp. iframensis Cullen
 subsp. insularum (Rothm.) Romo
 subsp. lapponica Hyl.
 subsp. lusitanica (Cullen & P. Silva) Franco
 subsp. maritima (Hagen) Corb.
 subsp. matris-filiae Emb. & Maire
 subsp. maura (Beck) Maire
 subsp. microcephala (Willk.) Benedi
 subsp. nivalis (Willk.) Rivas Mart. & al.
 subsp. pindicola Cullen
 subsp. polyphylla (DC.) "Nyman, p.p."
 subsp. praeporea (A. Kern.) Bornm.
 subsp. pseudoarundana H. Lindb.
 subsp. pulchella (Vis.) Bornm.
 subsp. pyrenaica (Beck) Cullen
 subsp. reuteri Cullen
 subsp. rifana (Emb. & Maire) Cullen
 subsp. rubriflora (DC.) Arcang.
 subsp. saharae (Sagorski) Maire
 subsp. sampaiana (Rothm.) Vasc.

 subsp. schiwereckii (DC.) Tzvelev
 subsp. stenophylloides Cullen
 subsp. vitellina (Velen.) Kuzmanov
 subsp. vulneraria L.
 var. font-queri (Rothm.) Cullen
 var. macedonica (Degen & Dörfl.) Micevski & Matevski
 var. vulneraria L.
 subsp. vulnerarioides (All.) Arcang.
 subsp. weldeniana (Rchb.) Cullen

Section Barba-Jovis
 Anthyllis aurea Welden
 Anthyllis barba-jovis L.

 Anthyllis hermanniae L.
 Anthyllis hystrix (Barcelo) Cardona & al.
 Anthyllis splendens Willd.

Section Cornicina
 Anthyllis circinnata (L.) Savi
 Anthyllis cornicina L.
 Anthyllis hamosa Desf.
 Anthyllis lotoides L.

Section Dorycnioides
 Anthyllis onobrychoides Cav.
 Anthyllis polycephala Desf.
 Anthyllis ramburii Boiss.
 Anthyllis rupestris Coss.
 Anthyllis tejedensis Boiss.
 subsp. plumosa (E. Domínguez) Benedí
 subsp. tejedensis Boiss.
 Anthyllis warnieri Emb.

Section Oreanthyllis

 Anthyllis lagascana Benedi
 Anthyllis montana L.
 subsp. atropurpurea (Vuk.) Pignatti
 subsp. hispanica (Degen & Hervier) Cullen
 subsp. montana L.
 subsp. jacquinii (A.Kern.) Hayek

Section Terniflora
 Anthyllis cytisoides L.
 Anthyllis terniflora (Lag.) Pau

Incertae Sedis
 Anthyllis aegaea Turrill

 Anthyllis coccinea (L.) Beck
 Anthyllis fennica (Jalas) Akulova

 Anthyllis hegetschweileri (Hegetschweiler-Bodmer) Brügger
 Anthyllis henoniana Coss.
 Anthyllis hispidissima (Sagorski) W. Becker
 Anthyllis langei (Jalas) G. H. Loos
 Anthyllis pallidiflora (Jord. ex Sagorski) Prain

 Anthyllis polyphylloides Juz.

 Anthyllis variegata Grossh.
 Anthyllis webbiana Hook.

Species names with uncertain taxonomic status
The status of the following species is unresolved:

 Anthyllis adriatica Beck
 Anthyllis alpina G.Don
 Anthyllis argentea Desv.
 Anthyllis argentea Salisb.
 Anthyllis aspalathoides L.
 Anthyllis asphaltoides L.
 Anthyllis baldensis A.Kern. ex Sagorski

 Anthyllis bicephalos Gilib.
 Anthyllis bicolor Bertol.
 Anthyllis bicolor Bertol. ex Colla
 Anthyllis bicolor Dalla Torre & Sarnth.
 Anthyllis bidentata Munby
 Anthyllis biflora Sol.

 Anthyllis caucasica (Grossh.) Juz.
 Anthyllis chelmea Rothm.
 Anthyllis cherleri Brügger
 Anthyllis cicerifolia Pourr. ex Colmeiro
 Anthyllis circinnata (L.) D.D.Sokoloff
 Anthyllis collina Salisb.
 Anthyllis communis Rouy
 Anthyllis cretica Lam.

 Anthyllis cupensis Lam.
 Anthyllis densifolia Formánek
 Anthyllis depressa Lange

 Anthyllis dinarica Beck

 Anthyllis expallens Dalla Torre & Sarnth.
 Anthyllis flava Gouan
 Anthyllis fuersteinii Murr
 Anthyllis genistoides Dufour

 Anthyllis glaucescens Kit.
 Anthyllis gracilis Salisb.
 Anthyllis guyoti Chodat
 Anthyllis herzegovina Sagorski
 Anthyllis heterophylla L.
 Anthyllis hosmarensis Pau
 Anthyllis hystrix (Willk. ex F. Barcelo) M. A. Cardona, J. Contandriopoulus & E. Sierra
 Anthyllis indica Lour.
 Anthyllis italica Loudon

 Anthyllis jancheniana K.Malý ex Asch. & Graebn.
 Anthyllis kerneri Sagorski
 Anthyllis kosanini Degen
 Anthyllis lateriflora Pau
 Anthyllis leguminosa Gray
 Anthyllis linifolia L.
 Anthyllis lybica Rothm.
 Anthyllis macrocarpa Walp.
 Anthyllis media Pau
 Anthyllis mogadorensis Rothm.
 Anthyllis moncephalos Gilib.
 Anthyllis montana subsp. jacquinii (Rchb. f.) Rohlena
 Anthyllis multicaulis (Lam.) Pau

 Anthyllis numidica Coss. & Durieu
 Anthyllis occidentalis Rothm.
 Anthyllis onoides Burm.f.
 Anthyllis oreigenes Dalla Torre & Sarnth.
 Anthyllis pallida Opiz ex Nyman
 Anthyllis pentaphylla Steud.
 Anthyllis pseudo-arundana H. Lindb.
 Anthyllis pseudoarundanum H.Lindb.
 Anthyllis pseudo-cytisus Walp.
 Anthyllis pseudo-vulneraria Sagorski
 Anthyllis pubescens Stokes
 Anthyllis quinqueflora L.f.
 Anthyllis rubra Gouan
 Anthyllis rubriflora (Ser.) Degen
 Anthyllis rubriflora Hegetschw.
 Anthyllis rustica Mill.
 Anthyllis rusticana Wender.
 Anthyllis sanguinea Schur
 Anthyllis sericata Chatenier ex Rouy
 Anthyllis serpentini Bruegger ex Sagorski
 Anthyllis subdinarica Sagorski
 Anthyllis tangerina Pau
 Anthyllis tenuicaulis (Sagorski) Fritsch

 Anthyllis tirolensis Dalla Torre & Sarnth.
 Anthyllis tournefortii Schult. ex Steud.
 Anthyllis variicolor Jeanj.
 Anthyllis variiflora Dalla Torre & Sarnth.
 Anthyllis versicolor Dalla Torre & Sarnth.
 Anthyllis visciflora L.f.
 Anthyllis vulneraria subsp. balearica (Coss. ex Marès & Vigin.) O.Bolòs & Vigo
 Anthyllis vulneraria subsp. boscii Kerguelen
 Anthyllis vulneraria subsp. dertosensis (Rothm.) Font Quer
 Anthyllis vulneraria subsp. multifolia (W.Becker) O.Bolòs & Vigo
 Anthyllis vulneraria subsp. nana (Ten.) Tammaro
 Anthyllis vulneraria subsp. saharae (Sagorski) Jahand. & Maire
 Anthyllis vulneraria subsp. vulneraria var. bulgarica (Sagorski) Micevski & Matevski
 Anthyllis vulneraria subsp. vulneraria var. nana Ten.
 Anthyllis vulneraria subsp. vulneraria var. rubriflora DC.
 Anthyllis vulnernarioides Bonj. ex Reichb.
 Hymenocarpos nummularius (DC.) G. Don
 Hymenocarpos radiatus (L.) Cav.
 Hymenocarpos radiatus Link

Hybrids
The following hybrids have been described:
 Anthyllis ×baltica Juz. ex Z.V.Klochkova
 Anthyllis ×cazulensis Rivas Goday & Esteve Chueca
 Anthyllis ×currasii P.P. Ferrer, Roselló & Guara (= Anthyllis cytisoides (Lag.) Pau × Anthyllis lagascana Benedí)
 Anthyllis ×fortuita Guara & P.P.Ferrer
 Anthyllis ×polyphylloides Juz.

References

External links
LegumeWeb

 
Fabaceae genera